Heroes for Hire are a superhero team appearing in American comic books published by Marvel Comics. The team first appeared in Power Man and Iron Fist #54 (December 1978), and was created by Ed Hannigan and Lee Elias. The team continued to appear in comics regularly over the years, and has made guest appearances in television productions and game environments featuring other superheroes.

Publication history and original concept
The Heroes for Hire concept originated with solo series titled Luke Cage, Hero for Hire. As a "hero for hire", Cage tried to merge the usually pro bono world of superheroics with the bill-paying practicality of private investigation. Although the title changed to Luke Cage, Power Man in issue #17, Cage continued with his for-hire activities.

Initially, Heroes for Hire, Inc. was a small business licensed by the state of New York that offered a full line of professional investigation and protection services. Heroes for Hire was owned by Luke Cage and Daniel Rand (Iron Fist). It had offices on Park Avenue and two paid employees: Jenny Royce, the group's secretary, and Jeryn Hogarth, the group's lawyer and business representative. Heroes for Hire would not accept jobs that involved extra-legal activities.

Fictional team biography

Power Man and Iron Fist
His own series cancelled due to low sales, Iron Fist joined the cast of Luke Cage, Power Man in a three-part storyline in #48–50. The comic's name changed to Power Man and Iron Fist from #50 upwards.  The two formed a new Heroes for Hire, Inc., founded by attorney Jeryn Hogarth and staffed by administrative wunderkind Jennie Royce. Iron Fist supporting cast characters Colleen Wing and Misty Knight also often appeared, although never becoming official members. This partnership lasted until the series' final issue #125, with Cage blamed for the apparent death of Iron Fist.

Heroes for Hire (1996)
In 1996, as a consequence of the "Onslaught" and "Heroes Reborn" storylines, the Marvel Universe suffered a power vacuum after the Fantastic Four and Avengers were presumed killed. Following up on the status of the Oracle Corporation that Namor had set up in the pages of Namor, Jim Hammond (the Golden Age Human Torch) and Danny Rand decided to set up a new Heroes for Hire organization. Iron Fist recruited Luke Cage for this. Heroes for Hire debuted in 1997, with a core team consisting of Iron Fist, Cage, and an assortment of hangers-on: Black Knight (Dane Whitman), a new White Tiger, Hercules, She-Hulk, Ant-Man (Scott Lang), the original Human Torch, and even Deadpool were included in the cast of the book, though much of the cast rotated in a Defenders-like manner, hired for missions as necessary. Heroes for Hire was written by John Ostrander and illustrated by Pasqual Ferry. It lasted for 19 issues before it was cancelled.

Heroes for Hire (2006)
A new Heroes for Hire series was developed as a spin-off of 2006's Civil War storyline. The book was initially written by Jimmy Palmiotti and Justin Gray (with art by Billy Tucci) who also wrote the Daughters of the Dragon mini-series starring Misty and Colleen. Many characters and plots followed from this series into Heroes for Hire. The series then changed hands and was written by Zeb Wells, with art by Terry Pallot.
The team roster for the book is Colleen Wing, Misty Knight, the new Tarantula, Shang-Chi, Humbug, Orka, Black Cat and Paladin, the latter two joining for money. They serve as enforcers for the Superhuman Registration Act. After the murder of Goliath in battle against the Cyborg Clone of Thor, they made plans to take on Captain America.

After learning Captain America's location from a Pixiu, the team (minus Orka and Tarantula) tracks him down. While Misty and the team just want to talk and find a peaceful solution, Paladin betrays them. Paladin disables the team with knockout gas and attempts to capture Captain America. Shang-Chi's martial arts training had allowed him to hold his breath long enough to avoid the effects of the gas. Shang-Chi defeats Paladin and switches his uniform with Captain America. When S.H.I.E.L.D. arrives, Paladin is unintentionally taken into custody.

Shortly thereafter, Captain America and the Heroes for Hire part ways, and the "anti-regs" abandon their now compromised base. Meanwhile, the Heroes for Hire discover a black-market operation that surgically implanted superhumans with Skrull organs that would endow those who had the operation with Skrull shapeshifting abilities. Several of these hybrid Skrull-villains bust Misty Knight's old foe Ricadonna from prison. Ricadonna destroys the Heroes' headquarters by sending an explosive package, and puts hits out on the entire team. Most notable of these were Insecticide (the hit man sent to kill Humbug — Humbug neutralized him with help from his pet killer bees), Shadow Stalker (an old foe of Shang-Chi sent to kill him—Shang-Chi quickly humiliated him), and the gang of ninjas that attacked Tarantula when she was with her father. After they murder her father, Tarantula kills the entire gang herself. The team splits up in search of Ricadonna; while Misty Knight and Colleen Wing try to shake up Toddler for information, Humbug uses his flies to discover Ricadonna's base—and also that she has somehow gained superpowers.

The team also comes into conflict with Grindhouse, the Headmen, and encounter Devil Dinosaur and Moon-Boy in the Savage Land. Following these adventures, the Heroes for Hire became involved in "World War Hulk", being captured aboard Hulk's stone ship. Humbug turns on the group, but in turn is betrayed by Earth's hive, which had been using him from the start. Colleen and Tarantula are heavily tortured, but are rescued by the rest of the team. Shang-Chi kills Humbug to avenge Tarantula's torture, and possibly out of mercy, as Humbug had mutated into a grotesque monster and was in great pain. Afterward the team splits up, with Paladin taking Moon-boy in for the reward offered for his capture. Black Cat tries to appeal to Paladin's good nature, but Paladin kicks her away and informs her she does not know him at all. Shang-Chi departs the group carrying the still injured Tarantula in his arms. Misty attempts to console a still heavily distraught Colleen, trying to encourage her that the team could still keep going, but Colleen will hear none of it. Colleen states that the moment the team sold their service as heroes they sold the best part of themselves. Colleen walks away leaving Misty alone, signaling the complete end of team.

Heroes for Hire (2010)
In 2010, Marvel debuted a new Heroes for Hire series. The book spins off from the aftermath of the Shadowland storyline.  This time, the team is run more like an organization, with revolving members, each hero in regards to the mission. Unlike previous incarnations, members work for benefits such as crime tips and backup when needed as opposed to money. The organization is originally run by a mind controlled Misty Knight with a team that includes Ghost Rider, Iron Fist, Moon Knight, Punisher, Black Widow, Paladin, Falcon, Silver Sable, and Elektra. After Paladin and Iron Fist free Misty from mind control, the other members find out and lose faith in the organization. Paladin convinces Misty to restart the operation from the ground up with him and earn the respect of the superhero community. The first to rejoin the operation is Spider-Man.

During the "Spider-Island" storyline, Heroes for Hire is called in by Mayor J. Jonah Jameson into helping to quarantine Manhattan after an outbreak that caused anyone exposed to the bites of genetically-engineered bedbugs to develop spider-like powers. Heroes for Hire ended up fighting spider-powered versions of Chemistro, Cheshire Cat, Commanche, Cottonmouth, Dontrell "Cockroach" Hamilton, Mr. Fish, Nightshade, and Spear.

Villains for Hire (2011)
In a new series spinning out of events from the end of Heroes for Hire, Misty Knight leads a new group of heroes consisting of Black Panther, Silver Sable, and Paladin. However, through yet known circumstances, she forms a sub-group of villains consisting of Bombshell, Crossfire, Nightshade, and Tiger Shark.

The Villains for Hire team was led by Purple Man and Headhunter and the line-up consists of Avalanche, Death-Stalker, Shocker, and Scourge. Purple Man's Villains for Hire went up against Misty Knight's crew. The group is later joined by Bushmaster and Monster during their fight with Misty Knight's crew. Tiger Shark and Bombshell leave Misty Knight's crew as she gains Speed Demon and Lady Stilt-Man. Purple Man later dispatched Villains for Hire to attack Misty Knight's headquarters with some of them getting taken down by the traps that Misty Knight has set. During the fight, Lady Stilt-Man defects to Purple Man's side as Bombshell, Man-Ape, and Tiger Shark joins as well. Misty Knight reveals that she gained the assistance of Puppet Master who uses the criminals on Misty Knight's side as part of Puppet Master's payback on Purple Man, and that the Scourge working for the Purple Man was actually Paladin working undercover.

Mighty Avengers (2013)
During the Infinity, Luke Cage is shown leading a new Heroes for Hire roster consisting of himself, White Tiger and Power Man. The team dissolves after White Tiger quits when the Superior Spider-Man (Doctor Octopus' mind in Peter Parker's body) considered the team mercenaries following a fight with Plunderer. The remnants of the group go on to form the new Mighty Avengers during Thanos's invasion of Earth.

Deadpool's "Heroes for Hire" (2015)

Eight months after the events of the Secret Wars storyline as seen during the All-New, All-Different Marvel event, Deadpool establishes a new team of Heroes for Hire. The roster consists of Solo, Madcap, Slapstick, Foolkiller, Terror and Stingray. Matt Murdock and Luke Cage are shown planning legal action against Deadpool. After the lawsuit goes through, Deadpool renames his Heroes for Hire group into Deadpool's "Mercs for Money."

The Defenders (2018)
After defeating Diamondback, Luke Cage, Iron Fist and Jessica Jones reformed the Heroes for Hire.

Members

Heroes for Hire I
 Luke Cage
 Iron Fist

Heroes for Hire II
 Human Torch (leader)
 Ant-Man II
 Black Knight III
 Hercules
 Iron Fist
 Luke Cage
 She-Hulk
 Thena
 White Tiger II

Heroes for Hire III
 Misty Knight
 Colleen Wing
 Black Cat
 Gargoyle
 Humbug
 Orka
 Paladin
 Shroud
 Tarantula VI
 Vienna

Heroes for Hire IV
 Misty Knight
 Colleen Wing
 Black Widow
 Elektra
 Falcon
 Ghost Rider
 Iron Fist
 Moon Knight
 Punisher
 Shang-Chi
 Silver Sable
 Spider-Man

Heroes for Hire V
 Hulk
 Iron Fist
 Deadpool
 Black Panther
 Doctor Strange
 Nate Dawes

Heroes for Hire VI
 Luke Cage
 Power Man
 White Tiger IV

Collected editions

Volume One

Volume Two

Volume Three

Villains For Hire

Creative teams

Writers
Volume One
 John Ostrander - Heroes for Hire #1–19 (July 1997–January 1999)
 Roger Stern - Heroes for Hire #1 (July 1997)

Volume Two
 Justin Gray - Heroes for Hire vol. 2 #1-7 (October 2006 - April 2007)
 Jimmy Palmiotti - Heroes for Hire vol. 2 #1-7 (October 2006 - April 2007)
 Zeb Wells - Heroes for Hire vol. 2 #7-15 (April–December 2007)

Artists
Volume One
 Pasqual Ferry - Heroes for Hire #1–10, 12, 15–16, 18–19 (July 1997–April 1998, June 1998, September 1998–October 1998, December 1998–January 1999); cover art #1–19 (July 1997–January 1999)
 Scott Kolins - Heroes for Hire #11 (May 1998)
 Martin Egeland - Heroes for Hire #13, 17 (July 1998, November 1998)
 Mary Mitchell - Heroes for Hire #14 (August 1998)
VOlume Two
 Billy Tucci - Heroes for Hire vol. 2 #1-4,  (October 2006-January 2007)
 Tom Palmer - Heroes for Hire vol. 2 #1, 2 (October & November 2006)
 Francis Portela - Heroes for Hire vol. 2 #2-5 (November 2006-February 2007)
 Alvaro Rio - Heroes for Hire vol. 2 #6-8 (March–May 2007)
 Clay Mann - Heroes for Hire vol. 2 #9-14 (June–November 2007)
 Alvin Lee - Heroes for Hire vol. 2 #14, 15 (November & December 2007)

Controversy
The 2006 volume of Heroes for Hire was at the center of a controversy concerning increased sexuality in mainstream comic books due to what some considered explicit and objectifying cover art to Heroes for Hire issue #13. The controversy centered on what critics viewed as an inappropriate level of sexuality, objectification and infantilisation on the cover of a comic aimed at ages twelve and up. Marvel's official response to the outcry was to apologize if the cover "struck a chord that it was completely unintended to strike".

In other media

Television
 The Heroes for Hire appear in The Super Hero Squad Show episode "A Brat Walks Among Us!", consisting of Iron Fist, Luke Cage, and Misty Knight.
 The Heroes for Hire appear in The Avengers: Earth's Mightiest Heroes, consisting of Iron Fist and Luke Cage.

Video games
The Heroes for Hire appear in Iron Fist's ending for Ultimate Marvel vs. Capcom 3, consisting of himself, Luke Cage, Misty Knight, and Colleen Wing as well as Capcom characters Ryu, Chun-Li, and Batsu Ichimonji.

Miscellaneous
The Heroes for Hire appear in the "Civil War" expansion for Legendary: A Marvel Deck Building Game, consisting of Colleen Wing, Humbug, Shang-Chi, and Tarantula.

References

External links
 Heroes for Hire at Marvel.com

Comics characters introduced in 1978
Characters created by Lee Elias
Marvel Comics titles
Fictional mercenaries in comics
1978 comics debuts
Comics by John Ostrander
Marvel Comics superhero teams
Luke Cage